The 1976 Washington Star International was a men's tennis tournament and was played on outdoor clay courts. It was categorized as a four star tournament and was part of the 1976 Grand Prix circuit. It was the 8th edition of the tournament and was held in Washington, D.C. from July 19 through July 26, 1976. Jimmy Connors won the singles title.

Finals

Singles
 Jimmy Connors defeated  Raúl Ramírez 6–2, 6–4
 It was Connors' 7th singles title of the year and the 48th of his career.

Doubles
 Brian Gottfried /  Raúl Ramírez defeated  Arthur Ashe /  Jimmy Connors 6–3, 6–3

References

External links
 ATP tournament profile
 ITF tournament edition details

Washington Open (tennis)
Washington Star International
Washington Star International
Washington Star International